Václav Krása (8 March 1932 – 19 November 2003) was a Czech basketball player. He competed in the men's tournament at the 1948 Summer Olympics.

References

External links
 

1932 births
2003 deaths
Czech men's basketball players
Olympic basketball players of Czechoslovakia
Basketball players at the 1948 Summer Olympics
Place of birth missing